C. nigra may refer to:

Animals
 Cardiocondyla nigra, an ant species in the genus Cardiocondyla
 Ciconia nigra, a large wading bird species
 Coracopsis nigra, a black coloured parrot species native to Comoros, Madagascar, Mayotte and Seychelles
 Chelonoidis niger, the largest living species of tortoise, often historically misspelled as "nigra"

Plants
 Carex nigra, a perennial plant species native to wetlands of Europe and Siberia
 Crataegus nigra, a hawthorn species
 Centaurea nigra, a flowering plant species

See also
 Nigra (disambiguation)